Gmina Sawin is a rural gmina (administrative district) in Chełm County, Lublin Voivodeship, in eastern Poland.

Villages
Gmina Sawin contains the villages and settlements of Aleksandrówka, Bachus, Bukowa Mała, Bukowa Wielka, Chutcze, Czułczyce, Czułczyce Małe, Czułczyce-Kolonia, Hredków, Jagodne, Krobonosz, Krobonosz-Kolonia, Łowcza, Łowcza-Kolonia, Łukówek, Malinówka, Petryłów, Podpakule, Przysiółek, Radzanów, Sajczyce, Sawin, Serniawy, Serniawy-Kolonia, Średni Łan, Tomaszówka and Wólka Petryłowska.

Neighbouring gminas
Gmina Sawin is bordered by the gminas of Chełm, Hańsk, Ruda-Huta, Wierzbica and Wola Uhruska.

References
Polish official population figures 2006

Sawin
Chełm County